The 1941–42 NCAA men's basketball season began in December 1941, progressed through the regular season and conference tournaments, and concluded with the 1942 NCAA basketball tournament championship game on March 28, 1942, at Municipal Auditorium in Kansas City, Missouri. The Stanford Indians won their first NCAA national championship with a 53–38 victory over the Dartmouth Big Green.

Season headlines 

 The Metropolitan New York Conference did not compete during the season. Its members played as independents.
 Dartmouth and Kansas became the first teams to play in more than one NCAA tournament when they appeared in the 1942 tournament.
 In February 1943, the Helms Athletic Foundation retroactively selected Stanford as its national champion for the 1941–42 season.
 In 1995, the Premo-Porretta Power Poll retroactively selected Stanford as its national champion for the 1941–42 season.

Conference membership changes

Regular season

Conference winners and tournaments

Statistical leaders

Post-season tournaments

NCAA tournament

Semifinals & finals

National Invitation tournament

Semifinals & finals 

 Third Place – Creighton 48, Toledo 46

Awards

Consensus All-American teams

Major player of the year awards 

 Helms Player of the Year: Stan Modzelewski, Rhode Island State

Other major awards 

 NIT/Haggerty Award (Top player in New York City metro area): Jim White, St. John's (retroactive selection in 1944)

Coaching changes 

A number of teams changed coaches during the season and after it ended.

References